Bagul or Bagal is a Maharatta clan and a surname. Bagul clan descends from the Suryavanshi Rashtraudha Dyansty of Baglana. The surname is also found in other castes.

Origin
According to Rudra kavi's Rashtrudha vamsham mahakavyam (1596 A.D) the founder of the bagul principality of mayugiri belonged to the Rathore (Rashtrakutas) family. And originally came from Kannauj.

Notable people with the surname include
Madhavrao Bagal (1895–1986), Indian politician
Sahebrao Sukram Bagul (born 1953), Indian politician

References